Kraken V Symbol Footprint is the name of the fifth studio album Colombian group Kraken,    It was released on August 3, 1995 by Discos Fuentes. The first single from the album was "Silencioso Amor". The second single was "El Símbolo de la Huella".

Information 
This album showed a band exploratory facet. A high quality album art, sound influenced by the Jazz and Blues. For many one of the most aesthetic albums in rock history Colombiano.

Track listing

References 

Kraken (band) albums
1995 albums